The Warning, also known as Introspection, is a 1928 British silent drama film directed by Reginald Fogwell and starring Percy Marmont, Fern Andra and Anne Grey. It was made at Welwyn Studios. It was originally released silent, but in 1930 it was re-released with added sound.

Premise
A mother tries to persuade her daughter from eloping.

Cast
 Percy Marmont as Jim 
 Fern Andra as The Other Woman 
 Anne Grey as Mary 
 Pearl Hay as The Child

References

Bibliography
 Chibnall, Steve. Quota Quickies: The Birth of the British 'B' film. British Film Institute, 2007.
 Wood, Linda. British Films, 1927-1939. British Film Institute, 1986.

External links

1928 films
1928 drama films
British drama films
British silent feature films
Films shot at Welwyn Studios
Films directed by Reginald Fogwell
British black-and-white films
1920s English-language films
1920s British films
Silent drama films